Coolangatta is the southernmost suburb of Gold Coast City, Queensland, Australia.

Coolangatta may also refer to:

 Town of Coolangatta, Queensland (1914-1949), former town in South East Queensland
 Coolangatta, New South Wales, a region on the New South Wales South Coast
 Gold Coast Airport, airport on the Queensland Gold Coast known as Coolangatta Airport until 1999